This is a list of notable poets who have written in the Spanish language.

Argentina

 Jorge Luis Borges (1899–1986)
 Nemer ibn el Barud (1925–2010)
 Jacobo Fijman (1898–1970)
 Juan Gelman (1930–2014)
 Oliverio Girondo (1891–1967)
 José Hernández (1834–1886)
 Roberto Juarroz (1925–1995)
 Leopoldo Lugones (1874–1938)
 Alejandra Pizarnik (1936–1972)
 Alfonsina Storni (1892–1938)

Bolivia
 Jaime Saenz (1921–1986)
 Javier del Granado (1913–1996)

Chile

 Miguel Arteche (1926–2012)
 Roberto Bolaño (1953–2003)
 Sergio Badilla Castillo (born 1947)
 Javier Campos (born 1947)
 Oscar Hahn (born 1938)
 Vicente Huidobro (1893–1948)
 Víctor Jara (1932–1973)
 Enrique Lihn (1929–1988)
 Patricio Manns (1937–2021)
 Carmen Marai - born Carmen María Bassa
 Gabriela Mistral - born Lucila Godoy, (1889–1957) Nobel laureate in 1945
 Pablo Neruda - born Neftalí Ricardo Reyes, (1904–1973) Nobel laureate in 1971
 Nicanor Parra (1914–2018)
 Carlos Pezoa Véliz (1879–1908)
 Mauricio Redolés (born 1953)
 Gonzalo Rojas (1917–2011)
 Pablo de Rokha - born Carlos Díaz Loyola (1894–1968)
 David Rosenmann-Taub (born 1927)
 Daniel de la Vega (1892–1971)

Colombia
 Porfirio Barba Jacob (1883–1942)
 Jorge Isaacs
 Rafael Pombo
 José Asunción Silva (1865–1896)
 Gabriel García Márquez (1927–2014) Nobel Laureate 1982
 Olga Elena Mattei (born 1933)

Cuba
 Mariano Brull
 Julián del Casal (1863–1893)
 Gertrudis Gómez de Avellaneda (1814–1873)
 Nicolás Guillén (1902–1989)
 Pedro Juan Gutiérrez (born 1950)
 José María Heredia
 José Lezama Lima (1910–1976)
 Dulce María Loynaz
 José Martí (1853–1895)
 Nancy Morejón (born 1944)
 Virgilio Piñera (1912–1979)
 Roberto Fernández Retamar (1930–2019)
 Severo Sarduy (1937–1993)

Dominican Republic
 Joaquín Balaguer
 Juan Bosch
 Aída Cartagena Portalatín
 Leopoldo Minaya
 Pedro Mir
 Juan Esteban Ariza Mendoza
 Frank Báez
 León Félix Batista
 Rei Berroa
 Manuel del Cabral
 Fernando Cabrera (writer)
 Aída Cartagena Portalatín
 Tulio Manuel Cestero
 Jaime Colson
 Alfredo Fernández Simó
 Fabio Fiallo
 Cristino Gómez
 Chico Gonzalez
 Angela Hernández Nuñez
 Blas Jiménez
 Miguel D. Mena
 Leopoldo Minaya
 Domingo Moreno Jimenes
 Juan Isidro Moreno
 Mateo Morrison
 César Nicolás Penson
 Andrea Evangelina Rodríguez Perozo
 Rosa Silverio
 Salomé Ureña
 Jael Uribe
 Marcio Veloz Maggiolo

Ecuador
 Jorge Carrera Andrade (1903–1978)
 Alejandro Carrión (1915–1992)
 Jorge Enrique Adoum (1926–2009)
 Ignacio Lasso (1911–1943)
 Adalberto Ortiz (1914–2003)
 Pedro Jorge Vera (1915–1999)
 Medardo Ángel Silva (1898–1919)
 Joaquín Gallegos Lara (1911–1947)
 Sonia Manzano Vela (born 1947 )

El Salvador
 Alfredo Espino (1900–1928)
 Roque Dalton (1935–1975)
 Alberto Masferrer (born 1959)

Honduras
 Óscar Acosta (1933–2014)
 Juan Ramón Molina (1875–1908)
 Roberto Sosa (1930–2011)
 Froylán Turcios (1875–1943)

Mexico

See also List of Mexican poets

 Elvia Ardalani (born 1963)
 José Carlos Becerra (1936–1970)
 Rubén Bonifaz Nuño (1923–2013)
 Rosario Castellanos (1925–1974)
 Elsa Cross (born 1946)
 Jorge Cuesta (1903–1942)
 Salvador Díaz Mirón (1853–1928)
 Enrique González Martínez (1871–1952)
 José Gorostiza (1901–1973)
 Manuel Gutiérrez Nájera (1859–1895)
 Germán List Arzubide (1898–1998)
 Ramón López Velarde (1888–1921)
 Manuel Maples Arce (1898–1981)
 Amado Nervo (1870–1919)
 Salvador Novo (1904–1974)
 José Emilio Pacheco (1939–2014)
 Octavio Paz (1914–1998) Nobel Laureate (1990)
 Carlos Pellicer (1897–1977)
 Alfonso Reyes (1889–1959)
 Jaime Sabines (1926–1999)
 Sor Juana Inés de la Cruz (1651–1695)
 José Juan Tablada (1871–1945)
 Xavier Villaurrutia (1903–1950)
 Gabriel Zaid (born 1934)

Nicaragua

 Rubén Darío (1867–1916)
 Azarías Pallais (1888–1954)
 Salomón de la Selva (1893–1959)
 Alfonso Cortés (1893–1969)
 José Coronel Urtecho (1906–1994)
 Pablo Antonio Cuadra (1912–2002)
 Joaquín Pasos (1914–1947)
 Claribel Alegría (1924–2018)
 Ernesto Cardenal (1925–2020)
 Gioconda Belli (born 1948)
 Daisy Zamora (born 1950)
 Blanca Castellón (born 1958)

Paraguay
 Julio Correa (1890–1926)
 Renée Ferrer de Arréllaga (born 1944)
 José Ricardo Mazó (1927–1987)
 Manuel Ortiz Guerrero (1894–1933)
 Josefina Pla (1909–1999)
 Roque Vallejos (1943–2006)

Peru
 Jose Santos Chocano (1875–1934) - author of Alma América
 Manuel González Prada (1844–1918)
 César Vallejo (1892–1938)
 Ana María Llona Málaga (born 1936) - author of Animal tan Albo
 Isabel Sabogal (born 1958)

The Philippines
 Pedro Paterno (1858–1911)
 José Rizal (1861–1896)
 Fernando María Guerrero (1873–1929)
 Jesús Balmori (1887–1948)
 Claro M. Recto (1890–1960)
 Adelina Gurrea (1896–1971)
 Guillermo Gómez Rivera (born 1936)
 Edmundo Farolan (born 1943)

Puerto Rico
 Aurora de Albornoz (1926–1990)
 Maria Arrillaga (born 1940)
 Giannina Braschi (born 1953)
 Julia de Burgos (1916–1953)
 Virgilio Dávila (1869–1943)
 Luis Lloréns Torres (1876–1944)
 Mercedes Negrón Muñoz a.k.a. Clara Lair (1895–1973)
 Benito Pastoriza Iyodo (born 1954)
 Luis Palés Matos (1898–1959)
 Evaristo Ribera Chevremont (1896–1976)
 Lola Rodríguez de Tió (1843–1924)

Spain

 Rafael Alberti (1902–1999)
 Juan Ruiz (c. 1283–c. 1350)
 Gonzalo de Berceo (c. 1190–1264?)
 Juan Boscán (1490–1542)
 Vicente Aleixandre (1898–1984) Nobel Laureate 1977
 Dámaso Alonso (1898–1990)
 Gustavo Adolfo Bécquer (1836–1870)
 Matilde Camus (1919–2012)
 Luis Cernuda (1903–1963)
 Juan de la Cruz (1542–1591)
 Aurora de Albornoz (1926–1990)
 Baltasar del Alcázar (1530–1606)
 Francisco Domene (born 1960)
 León Felipe (1884–1968)
 Federico García Lorca (1898–1936)
 José Luis Giménez-Frontín (1943–2008)
 Luis de Góngora (?–1627)
 Juan Antonio González Iglesias (born 1964)
 Jorge Guillén (1893–1984)
 Miguel Hernández (1910–1942)
 Clara Janés (born 1940)
 Santa Teresa de Jesús (1515–1582)
 Juan Ramón Jiménez (1881–1958) Nobel Laureate 1956
 Luis de León (1527–1591?)
 Antonio Machado (1875–1936)
 Manuel Machado (1874–1947)
 Jorge Manrique (1440–1479)
 Juan L. Ortiz
 Emilio Prados (1899–1962)
 Francisco de Quevedo (1580–1645)
 Pedro Salinas (1892–1951)
 Francisco Sánchez Barbero (1764–1819)
 Garcilaso de la Vega (1503–1536)
 Lope de Vega (1562–1635)
 Esteban Manuel de Villegas (1589–1669)
 Leopoldo María Panero (1948–2014)
 Manuel Curros Enríquez
 Alonso de Ercilla
 Joaquín Sabina
 Íñigo López de Mendoza, 1st Marquis of Santillana
 Gutierre de Cetina
 Juan del Encina (1469–1533)
 José de Espronceda (1808–1842)
 Rosalía de Castro (1837–1885)
 Francisco Domene
 Chantal Maillard
 Antonio Martínez Sarrión
 José Ortega Torres
 Leopoldo Panero
 Luisa Castro
 Clara Janés
 Enrique García-Máiquez
 Carlos Martínez Aguirre (born 1974)

United States
 Giannina Braschi
 Sandra Cisneros
 Benito Pastoriza Iyodo
 Juan Felipe Herrera

Uruguay
 Delmira Agustini (1886–1914)
 Mario Benedetti  (1920–2009)
 María Herminia Sabbia y Oribe (1883-1961)

Venezuela
 Andrés Bello (1781–1865)
 Enrique Moya (born 1958)
 Aquiles Nazoa (1920–1976)
 Yolanda Pantin (born 1954)
 Arturo Uslar Pietri (1906–2001)

See also
 List of poets
 List of Latin American writers

Spanish-language
Poets